Gymnothorax niphostigmus, the snowflake-patched moray, is a moray eel found in the northwest Pacific Ocean around Taiwan. It was first named by Chen, Shao, and Chen in 1996.

References

niphostigmus
Taxa named by Chen Hong-Ming 
Taxa named by Shao Kwang-Tsao
Fish described in 1996